David Turcotte (born July 10, 1965 in Ottawa, Ontario) is a former star Canadian basketball player, former Olympic athlete, an attorney, and the current CEO of a technology startup company, StreamPC. A 6-foot, 3-inch shooting guard, he was a member of the Canadian men's national basketball team from 1982 through 1995 including the 1988 Seoul Olympic Games. He is of certified Algonquin people descent and a member of the Ottawa Algonquin Community.

Turcotte attended Lockerby Composite High School in Sudbury, Ontario, Canada, where he played hockey and basketball for the Lockerby Composite High Vikings.

He attended Colorado State University (CSU) where played on the men's basketball team from 1984 to 1988. Under Turcotte's leadership, the Colorado State Rams took third place in the 1988 National Invitational Tournament. Turcotte scored 1,508 points while at Colorado State University, which is the fifth most total points scored by any player in school history. He was a two-time honorable mention all-WAC pick and was on all-WAC academic in 1988. During his time at CSU, Turcotte was a finalist in the NCAA Postgraduate award program. Turcotte graduated in 1988 from Colorado State University with degrees in economics and finance.

From 1989 to 1993 Turcotte attended the J. Reuben Clark Law School law school at Brigham Young University (BYU) completing his J.D. in 1993.

Canadian men's national basketball team 
From 1982 to 1995 Turcotte played for the Canadian men's national basketball team participating in many tournaments and events including the 1988 Seoul Summer Olympic Games where Canada took 4th place in Group B and finished in 6th place overall.

In 1992 Turcotte and Team Canada took on the U.S. Dream Team during an Olympic qualifying round at the 1992 Tournament of the Americas in Portland, Oregon. The 1992 Dream Team members at the time included NBA stars Michael Jordan, Scottie Pippen, Magic Johnson, John Stockton, Karl Malone, Larry Bird, Patrick Ewing, David Robinson, Chris Mullin, and Charles Barkley.

Professional and non-profit work 
Turcotte began his career in the legal profession quickly moving into technology and tech startups. Most notably, he incorporated and assisted in the initial operation of Fusion Multi-Systems, Inc. which became Fusion-io that went public in 2011 with a valuation of $1.5 billion. After his time at Fusion-io, Turcotte maintained his focus on technology, specifically in Virtualization, Security and Cloud IT Automation serving as the Chief Legal Officer of AccessData Group, Inc., a Data Security, eDiscovery and Incident Response company based in Utah since 2013. He is currently the CEO of StreamPC, a workspace technology-as-a-service company.

Turcotte is a co-founder of the National Basketball Teams Alumni Association, an association for former men's and women's Canadian National Basketball Team members created to preserve the history and culture of basketball in Canada.

Turcotte was active in the community during his university years as a featured columnist for the Fort Collins Coloradoan, and as a public speaker in the Fort Collins, Colorado, area for the Fort Collins Public Schools system, the Say No to Drugs program, and the Fort Collins Muscular Dystrophy Association.

References

External links 

1965 births
Living people
Basketball players at the 1988 Summer Olympics
Canadian expatriate basketball people in the United States
Canadian lawyers
Canadian men's basketball players
Colorado State Rams men's basketball players
J. Reuben Clark Law School alumni
Olympic basketball players of Canada
Basketball players from Ottawa